"Breakin' The Chainz" is a 2005 single by Swedish glam metal band Crashdïet. This was the third single for the band and appears on their 2005 debut album, Rest in Sleaze. A music video was shot for the song. It is one of their most famous songs, and during their concerts they usually play it somewhere near the end. The B-side, Tomorrow, is a demo and was only featured on the Japanese version of Rest In Sleaze. The song debuted at #47 on the Swedish singles chart.

Track listing
Breakin' The Chainz
Tomorrow (Demo)

Personnel
Dave Lepard - vocals, guitar
Martin Sweet - Guitar
Peter London - Bass guitar
Eric Young - drums

External links
Official Crashdiet website

2005 singles
Songs written by Dave Lepard
Crashdïet songs
2005 songs
Universal Music Group singles